Rene Simpson Collins (14 January 1966 – 17 October 2013) was a Canadian professional tennis player from Sarnia, Ontario. She reached a WTA singles ranking of 70 in 1989, and had a successful NCAA career for Texas Christian University.

She was a member of the Canada Fed Cup team from 1988 to 1998, coach from 1998 to 2000, and captain from 2001 to 2010.

She was inducted into the Canadian Tennis Hall of Fame in 2011.

Simpson died on 17 October 2013 after a year-long battle with brain cancer. She was 47.

WTA career finals

Singles: 1 (1 runner-up)

Doubles: 4 (3 titles, 1 runner-up)

ITF finals

Singles (4–1)

Doubles (3–2)

References

External links

1966 births
2013 deaths
Canadian expatriate sportspeople in the United States
Canadian female tennis players
Deaths from cancer in Illinois
Deaths from brain cancer in the United States
Sportspeople from Sarnia
Texas Christian University alumni
TCU Horned Frogs women's tennis players
Racket sportspeople from Ontario